Kuata is an island of the Yasawa Group in Fiji's Ba Province. Tourism is of growing importance to the island's economy. The small resort is very pleasant and friendly. It offers different types of accommodation from backpackers to en-suite, the food is quite good and the walk to the top of the island with views to Waya Island to the north are spectacular. Swimming in the lagoon is excellent. It is possible to snorkel with small sharks, to dive or learn diving. Several science and conservation projects are happening on the island.

Ba Province
Islands of Fiji
Yasawa Islands